Rondy Colbert, (born January 7, 1954) is a former American football defensive back. He played for the New York Giants from 1975 to 1976 and for the St. Louis Cardinals in 1977.

References

1954 births
Living people
American football defensive backs
Lamar Cardinals football players
New York Giants players
St. Louis Cardinals (football) players